Wahlqvist is a Swedish surname. Notable people with the surname include:

Johnny Wahlqvist (c. 1973 – 2017), Swedish powerlifter
Lars Wahlqvist (born 1964), Swedish cyclist
Linus Wahlqvist (born 1996), Swedish footballer
Victor Wahlqvist (born 1991), Swedish ice hockey player

Swedish-language surnames